The Canberra Nature Park is a series of thirty three separate protected areas in and around Canberra, Australian Capital Territory, ranging from bushland hills to lowland native grassland. Many of the areas have previously been cleared for grazing, but many are now being returned to native bushland through revegetation and rehabilitation programs.

Canberra's inner hills Black Mountain, Mount Ainslie, Mount Majura, Mount Pleasant, Russell Hill, Red Hill, Mount Mugga, O'Connor Ridge, Bruce Ridge, Aranda Bushland, Mount Painter, The Pinnacle, Lyneham Ridge, Oakey Hill, Mount Taylor, Isaacs Ridge, Mount Stromlo, Mount Arawang, Neighbour Hill, Wanniassa Hill, and Narrabundah Hill are protected from development by the National Capital Plan and almost all are now part of the Canberra Nature Park system. These hills provide a scenic backdrop and natural setting for Canberra's urban areas, as originally set out in the Walter Burley Griffin Plan.

Most people in Canberra live within easy walking distance of a Canberra Nature Park area.

The areas are typically enclosed by simple wire fences, or by house fences. Gates are provided for people to walk or run in the parks; motorbikes are excluded. Some parks with mountains have reservoirs, as part of ACT Electricity and Water's supply network.

See also
List of Australian Capital Territory protected areas

References

External links

Canberra Nature Park - Territory and Municipal Services

Parks in Canberra
Protected areas of the Australian Capital Territory
Nature reserves of the Australian Capital Territory